An NRJ Music Award (commonly abbreviated as an NMA) is an award presented by the French radio station NRJ to honor the best in the French and worldwide music industry. The awards ceremony, created in 2000 by NRJ in partnership with the television network TF1, traditionally took place every year in mid-January at Cannes (Provence-Alpes-Côte d'Azur, France) as the opening of MIDEM (Marché international de l'édition musicale). It is now held in the month of November. They give out awards to popular musicians in different categories.

The name "NRJ" means  "Nouvelle Radio des Jeunes" (new radio of the young). It is a play on words between the pronunciation of the French letters and the French word "énergie" (energy). Val Kahl hosted and presented "Les Coulisses des NRJ Music Awards" Season 2011, 2012 and 2013 on NRJ12.

Award categories

Awards in the following categories are awarded to the musicians each year:

 Francophone Breakthrough of the Year (Révélation francophone de l'année)
 International Breakthrough of the Year (Révélation internationale de l'année)
 Francophone Male Artist of the Year (Artiste masculin francophone de l'année)
 International Male Artist of the Year (Artiste masculin international de l'année)
 Francophone Female Artist of the Year (Artiste féminine francophone de l'année)
 International Female Artist of the Year (Artiste féminine internationale de l'année)
 Francophone Song of the Year (Chanson francophone de l'année)
 International Song of the Year (Chanson internationale de l'année)
 Francophone Album of the Year (Album francophone de l'année)
 International Album of the Year (Album international de l'année)
 Francophone Duo/Group of the Year (Groupe/duo francophone de l'année)
 International Duo/Group of the Year (Groupe/duo international de l'année)
 Video of the Year (Clip de l'année)

NRJ chooses 5 nominees in each category, and subjects them to online voting on their website. Subsequently, the winners are determined by a system where the public weighs in at 75% of the decision, and a jury established by NRJ and TF1 at 25%.

Award winners

2000 Award Winners – 1st NRJ Music Awards
 Francophone Breakthrough  of the Year : Hélène Ségara
 International Breakthrough  of the Year : Tina Arena
 Francophone Male Artist of the Year : David Hallyday
 International Male Artist of the Year : Will Smith
 Francophone Female Artist of the Year : Mylène Farmer
 International Female Artist of the Year : Mariah Carey
 Francophone Song of the Year : Zebda – "Tomber la chemise"
 International Song of the Year : Lou Bega – "Mambo No. 5"
 Francophone Album of the Year : Mylène Farmer – Innamoramento
 International Album of the Year : Whitney Houston – My Love Is Your Love
 Francophone Duo/Group of the Year : Zebda
 International Duo/Group of the Year : Texas
 Music Website of the Year : Indochine
 Best concert of the Year : Mylène Farmer

2001 Award Winners – 2nd NRJ Music Awards
 Francophone Breakthrough  of the Year : Alizée
 International Breakthrough  of the Year : Anastacia
 Francophone Male Artist of the Year : Pascal Obispo
 International Male Artist of the Year : Moby
 Francophone Female Artist of the Year : Mylène Farmer
 International Female Artist of the Year : Madonna
 Francophone Song of the Year : Roméo & Juliette – "Les Rois du monde"
 International Song of the Year : Anastacia – "I'm Outta Love"
 Francophone Album of the Year : Hélène Ségara – Au nom d'une femme
 International Album of the Year : Madonna – Music
 Francophone Duo/Group of the Year : Les Dix Commandements
 International Duo/Group of the Year : The Corrs
 Music Website of the Year : Alizée

2002 Award Winners – 3rd NRJ Music Awards
 Francophone Breakthrough  of the Year : Ève Angeli
 International Breakthrough  of the Year : Dido
 Francophone Male Artist of the Year : Garou
 International Male Artist of the Year : Michael Jackson
 Francophone Female Artist of the Year : Mylène Farmer
 International Female Artist of the Year : Jennifer Lopez
 Francophone Song of the Year : Axel Bauer & Zazie – "À ma place"
 International Song of the Year : Geri Halliwell – "It's Raining Men"
 Francophone Album of the Year : Gérald De Palmas – Marcher dans le sable
 International Album of the Year : Dido – No Angel
 Francophone Duo/Group of the Year : Garou & Céline Dion
 International Duo/Group of the Year : Destiny's Child
 Music Website of the Year : Garou

2003 Award Winners – 4th NRJ Music Awards
 Francophone Breakthrough of the Year : Jenifer
 International Breakthrough of the Year : Las Ketchup
 Francophone Male Artist of the Year : Gérald De Palmas
 International Male Artist of the Year : Billy Crawford
 Francophone Female Artist of the Year : Mylène Farmer
 International Female Artist of the Year : Shakira
 Francophone Song of the Year : Renaud & Axelle Red – "Manhattan-Kaboul"
 International Song of the Year : Shakira – "Whenever, Wherever"
 Francophone Album of the Year : Indochine – Paradize
 International Album of the Year : Shakira – Laundry Service
 Francophone Duo/Group of the Year : Renaud & Axelle Red
 International Duo/Group of the Year : The Calling
 Music Website of the Year : Jennifer Lopez
 NRJ Award of Honor for the Career : Phil Collins

2004 Award Winners – 5th NRJ Music Awards
 Francophone Breakthrough of the Year : Nolwenn Leroy
 International Breakthrough of the Year : Evanescence
 Francophone Male Artist of the Year : Calogero
 International Male Artist of the Year : Justin Timberlake
 Francophone Female Artist of the Year : Jenifer
 International Female Artist of the Year : Dido
 Francophone Song of the Year : Kyo – "Le Chemin"
 International Song of the Year : Elton John & Blue – "Sorry Seems to Be the Hardest Word"
 Francophone Album of the Year : Kyo – Le Chemin
 International Album of the Year : Dido – Life for Rent
 Francophone Duo/Group of the Year : Kyo
 International Duo/Group of the Year : Good Charlotte
 Music website of the Year : Kyo
 NRJ Award of Honor for the Career : Madonna

2005 Award Winners – 6th NRJ Music Awards
 Francophone Breakthrough of the Year : Emma Daumas
 International Breakthrough of the Year : Maroon 5
 Francophone Male Artist of the Year : Roch Voisine
 International Male Artist of the Year : Usher
 Francophone Female Artist of the Year : Jenifer
 International Female Artist of the Year : Avril Lavigne
 Francophone Song of the Year : K-Maro – "Femme Like U"
 International Song of the Year : Maroon 5 – "This Love"
 Francophone Album of the Year : Jenifer – Le Passage
 International Album of the Year : The Black Eyed Peas – Elephunk
 Francophone Duo/Group of the Year : Calogero & Passi
 International Duo/Group of the Year : Placebo
 Video of the Year : Corneille – "Parce qu'on vient de loin"
 NRJ Award of Honor for the Career : U2

2006 Award Winners – 7th NRJ Music Awards
 Francophone Breakthrough of the Year : Grégory Lemarchal
 International Breakthrough of the Year : James Blunt
 Francophone Male Artist of the Year : Raphaël
 International Male Artist of the Year : Robbie Williams
 Francophone Female Artist of the Year : Jenifer
 International Female Artist of the Year : Anastacia
 Francophone Song of the Year : M. Pokora – "Elle me contrôle"
 International Song of the Year : Anastacia – "Left Outside Alone"
 Francophone Album of the Year : Mylène Farmer – Avant que l'ombre...
 International Album of the Year : The Black Eyed Peas – Monkey Business
 Francophone Duo/Group of the Year : Le Roi Soleil
 International Duo/Group of the Year : The Black Eyed Peas
 Video of the Year : M. Pokora – "Elle me contrôle"
 NRJ Award of Honor : Bob Geldof, for organizing the Live 8

2007 Award Winners – 8th NRJ Music Awards
 Francophone Breakthrough of the Year : Christophe Maé
 International Breakthrough of the Year : Nelly Furtado
 Francophone Female Artist of the Year : Diam's
 International Female Artist of the Year : Christina Aguilera
 Francophone Male Artist of the Year : M. Pokora
 International Male Artist of the Year : Justin Timberlake
 Francophone Duo/Group of the Year : Le Roi Soleil
 International Duo/Group of the Year : Evanescence
 International Song of the Year : Rihanna – "Unfaithful"
 Francophone Album of the Year : Diam's – Dans ma bulle
 International Album of the Year : Christina Aguilera – Back to Basics
 Francophone Song of the Year : Diam's – "La Boulette"
 Video of the Year : M. Pokora – "De retour"
 DJ of the Year : Bob Sinclar

2008 Awards Winners – 9th NRJ Music Awards
 Francophone Breakthrough of the Year : Christophe Willem
 International Breakthrough of the Year : Mika
 Francophone Female Artist of the Year : Jenifer
 International Female Artist of the Year : Avril Lavigne
 Francophone Male Artist of the Year : Christophe Maé
 International Male Artist of the Year : Justin Timberlake
 Francophone Duo/Group of the Year : Superbus
 International Duo/Group of the Year : Tokio Hotel
 International Song of the Year : Rihanna – "Don't Stop the Music"
 Francophone Album of the Year : Christophe Willem – Inventaire
 International Album of the Year : Britney Spears – Blackout
 Francophone Song of the Year : Christophe Maé – "On s'attache"
 Video of the Year : Fatal Bazooka – "Parle à ma main"
 NRJ Award of Honor : Céline Dion, Michael Jackson, and Kylie Minogue

2009 Awards Winners – 10th NRJ Music Awards
 Francophone Breakthrough of the Year : Zaho
 International Breakthrough of the Year : Jonas Brothers
 Francophone Female Artist of the Year : Jenifer
 International Female Artist of the Year : Britney Spears
 Francophone Male Artist of the Year : Christophe Maé
 International Male Artist of the Year : Enrique Iglesias
 Francophone Duo/Group of the Year : Cléopâtre
 International Duo/Group of the Year : The Pussycat Dolls
 International Song of the Year : Rihanna – "Disturbia"
 Francophone Album of the Year : Mylène Farmer - Point de suture
 International Album of the Year : Katy Perry – One of the Boys
 Francophone Song of the Year : Christophe Maé – "Belle Demoiselle"
 Video of the Year : Britney Spears – "Womanizer"
 NRJ Award of Honor : Coldplay

2010 Awards Winners – 11th NRJ Music Awards
 Francophone Breakthrough of the Year : Florent Mothe
 International Breakthrough of the Year : Lady Gaga
 Francophone Female Artist of the Year : Sofia Essaïdi
 International Female Artist of the Year:  Rihanna
 Francophone Male Artist of the Year : Christophe Willem
 International Male Artist of the Year : Robbie Williams
 Francophone Duo/Group of the Year : Mozart, l'opéra rock
 International Duo/Group of the Year : Tokio Hotel
 Francophone Song of the Year : "L'Assasymphonie" - Florent Mothe (Mozart l'Opéra Rock)
 International Song of the Year : "I Gotta Feeling" - The Black Eyed Peas
 Francophone Album of the Year : Caféine - Christophe Willem
 International Album of the Year : One Love - David Guetta
 Song Most Downloaded of the Year in France : "Ça m'énerve" - Helmut Fritz
 NRJ Award of Honor : Robbie Williams and Beyoncé

2011 Awards Winners – 12th NRJ Music Awards
 Francophone Breakthrough of the Year : Joyce Jonathan
 International Breakthrough of the Year : Justin Bieber
 Francophone Female Artist of the Year :  Jenifer
 International Female Artist of the Year : Shakira
 Francophone Male Artist of the Year : M. Pokora
 International Male Artist of the Year : Usher
 Francophone Duo/Group of the Year : Justin Nozuka & Zaho
 International Duo/Group of the Year : The Black Eyed Peas
 Francophone Song of the Year : M. Pokora – "Juste une photo de toi"
 International Song of the Year : Shakira – "Waka Waka (This Time for Africa)"
 Concert of the Year : The Black Eyed Peas
 Video of the Year :  Lady Gaga featuring Beyoncé – "Telephone"
 Hit of the Year : Flo Rida featuring David Guetta - "Club Can't Handle Me"
 NRJ Award of Honor : David Guetta

2012 Awards Winners – 13th NRJ Music Awards
 NRJ Award of Diamond : Mylène Farmer
 NRJ Award of Honor : Shakira and Justin Bieber
 Francophone Breakthrough of the Year : Keen'V
 International Breakthrough of the Year : Adele
 Francophone Female Artist of the Year : Shy'm
 International Female Artist of the Year : Rihanna
 Francophone Male Artist of the Year : M. Pokora
 International Male Artist of the Year : Mika
 Francophone Duo/Group of the Year : Simple Plan
 International Duo/Group of the Year : LMFAO
 Best-selling Francophone Album of the Year : Nolwenn Leroy - Bretonne
 Francophone Song of the Year : M. Pokora - "À nos actes manqués"
 International Song of the Year : Adele – "Someone like You"
 Video of the Year :  LMFAO featuring Lauren Bennett and GoonRock – "Party Rock Anthem"

2013 Awards Winners – 14th NRJ Music Awards
 Francophone Breakthrough of the Year : Tal
 International Breakthrough of the Year : Carly Rae Jepsen
 Francophone Female Artist of the Year : Shy'm
 International Female Artist of the Year : Rihanna
 Francophone Male Artist of the Year : M. Pokora
 International Male Artist of the Year : Bruno Mars
 Francophone Duo/Group of the Year : Sexion d'Assaut
 International Duo/Group of the Year : One Direction
 Francophone Song of the Year : Sexion d'Assaut - "Avant qu'elle parte"
 International Song of the Year : Psy - "Gangnam Style"
 Video of the Year : Psy - "Gangnam Style"
 NRJ Award of Honor : Psy, Johnny Hallyday and Patrick Bruel.

2013 Awards Winners – 15th NRJ Music Awards
 Francophone Breakthrough of the Year : Louis Delort
 International Breakthrough of the Year : James Arthur
 Francophone Female Artist of the Year : Shy'm
 International Female Artist of the Year : Sia
 Francophone Male Artist of the Year : Stromae
 International Male Artist of the Year : Mika
 Francophone Duo/Group of the Year : Robin des Bois
 International Duo/Group of the Year : One Direction
 Francophone Song of the Year : Stromae - "Formidable"
 International Song of the Year : Katy Perry - "Roar"
 Video of the Year : One Direction - "Best Song Ever"
 NRJ Award of Honor : Christophe Maé

2014 Awards Winners - 16th NRJ Music Awards
 Francophone Breakthrough of the Year : Kendji Girac
 International Breakthrough of the Year : Ariana Grande 
 Francophone Female Artist of the Year : Tal
 International Female Artist of the Year : Sia
 Francophone Male Artist of the Year : M. Pokora
 International Male Artist of the Year : Pharrell Williams
 Francophone Duo/Group of the Year : Daft Punk
 International Duo/Group of the Year : One Direction
 Francophone Song of the Year : Kendji Girac - "Color Gitano"
 International Song of the Year : Sia - "Chandelier"
 Video of the Year : Black M - "Mme Pavoshko"
 NRJ Award of Honor : Stromae and Lenny Kravitz

2015 Awards Winners - 17th NRJ Music Awards
 Francophone Breakthrough of the Year : Louane
 International Breakthrough of the Year : Ellie Goulding    
 Francophone Female Artist of the Year : Shy'm
 International Female Artist of the Year :Taylor Swift 
 Francophone Male Artist of the Year : M. Pokora
 International Male Artist of the Year : Ed Sheeran 
 Francophone Duo/Group of the Year : Fréro Delavega
 International Duo/Group of the Year : Maroon 5 
 Francophone Song of the Year : Kendji Girac - "Conmigo"
 International Song of the Year : Wiz Khalifa and Charlie Puth - "See You Again"
 Video of the Year : Taylor Swift and Kendrick Lamar - "Bad Blood"
 DJ of the Year : David Guetta
 NRJ Award of Honor : Adele, Charles Aznavour, Justin Bieber and Sting

2016 Awards Winners - 18th NRJ Music Awards
 Francophone Breakthrough of the Year : Amir 
 International Breakthrough of the Year : Twenty One Pilots
 Francophone Female Artist of the Year : Tal 
 International Female Artist of the Year : Sia
 Francophone Male Artist of the Year : Soprano
 International Male Artist of the Year : Justin Bieber
 Francophone Duo/Group of the Year : Fréro Delavega
 International Duo/Group of the Year : Coldplay 
 Francophone Song of the Year : Amir - "J'ai cherché"
 International Song of the Year : Justin Bieber - "Love Yourself"
 Video of the Year : Christophe Maé - "Il est où le bonheur"
 DJ of the Year : David Guetta
 Most Streamed Song : Coldplay featuring Beyoncé - "Hymn for the Weekend"
 NRJ Award of Honor : Bruno Mars, Enrique Iglesias and Coldplay

2017 Awards Winners - 19th NRJ Music Awards
 Francophone Breakthrough of the Year : Lisandro Cuxi
 International Breakthrough of the Year : Rag'n'Bone Man
 Francophone Female Artist of the Year : Louane
 International Female Artist of the Year : Selena Gomez
 Francophone Male Artist of the Year : Soprano
 International Male Artist of the Year : Ed Sheeran
 Francophone Duo/Group of the Year : Bigflo & Oli
 International Duo/Group of the Year : Imagine Dragons
 Francophone Song of the Year : Amir - "On dirait"
 International Song of the Year : Luis Fonsi & Daddy Yankee ft. Justin Bieber - "Despacito"
 Video of the Year : Ed Sheeran - "Shape of You"
 DJ of the Year : Kungs
 Most Streamed Song : Ed Sheeran - "Shape of You" 
 NRJ Award of Honor : The Weeknd, U2 and Indochine

2018 Awards Winners - 20th NRJ Music Awards
 Francophone Breakthrough of the Year: Dadju
 International Breakthrough of the Year: Camila Cabello
 Francophone Female Artist of the Year: Jain
 International Female Artist of the Year: Ariana Grande
 Francophone Male Artist of the Year: Soprano
 International Male Artist of the Year: Ed Sheeran
 Francophone Duo/Group of the Year: Bigflo & Oli
 International Duo/Group of the Year: Imagine Dragons
 Francophone Song of the Year: Kendji Girac - "Pour oublier"
 International Song of the Year: Maroon 5 featuring Cardi B - "Girls Like You"
 Video of the Year: Bigflo & Oli - "Demain"
 DJ of the Year: DJ Snake
 Most Streamed Song: Calvin Harris and Dua Lipa - "One Kiss"
 NRJ Award of Honor: Shawn Mendes and Muse

2019 Awards Winners - 21st NRJ Music Awards
 Francophone Song of the Year : Angèle and Roméo Elvis - "Tout oublier"
 Francophone Female Artist of the Year : Angèle
 International Female Artist of the Year : Ariana Grande
 Francophone Male Artist of the Year : M. Pokora
 International Male of the Year : Ed Sheeran
 Francophone Breakthrough of the Year : Bilal Hassani
 Francophone Duo/Group of the Year : Bigflo & Oli
 International Breakthrough of the Year : Billie Eilish
 Video of the Year : Bigflo & Oli - "Promesses"
 DJ of the Year : DJ Snake
 International Song of the year : Shawn Mendes and Camila Cabello -  "Señorita"

2020 Awards Winners - 22nd NRJ Music Awards
 Francophone Breakthrough of the Year : Squeezie
 International Breakthrough of the Year : Doja Cat
 Francophone Female Artist of the Year : Aya Nakamura
 International Female Artist of the Year : Dua Lipa
 Francophone Male Artist of the Year : Dadju
 International Male Artist of the Year : The Weeknd
 Francophone Duo/Group of the Year : Vitaa and Slimane
 International Duo/Group of the Year : BTS
 Francophone Song of the Year : Vitaa and Slimane - "Avant toi"
 International Song of the Year : Master KG and Burna Boy featuring Nomcebo Zikode - "Jerusalema"
 Francophone Collaboration of the Year : Soolking and Dadju - "Meleğim"
 International Collaboration of the Year : Lady Gaga and Ariana Grande - "Rain on Me"
 Francophone Performance of the Night : M. Pokora - "Si on disait"
 Video of the Year : Vitaa and Slimane - "Ça ira"
 DJ of the Year : DJ Snake
 NRJ Award of Honor : Indochine, Elton John, Gims
 International Icon : Mariah Carey

2021 Awards Winners - 23rd NRJ Music Awards
 Francophone Female Artist of the Year : Eva Queen
 Francophone Male Artist of the Year : Dadju
 Francophone Breakthrough of the Year : Naps
 Francophone Duo/Group of the Year : Vitaa and Slimane
 Francophone Collaboration of the Year : Amel Bent and Hatik - "1, 2, 3"
 International Female Artist of the Year : Dua Lipa
 International Male Artist of the Year : Ed Sheeran
 International Breakthrough of the Year : Olivia Rodrigo
 International Duo/Group of the Year : Coldplay
 International Collaboration of the Year : Coldplay and BTS - "My Universe"
 Internation Song of the Year : Ed Sheeran - "Bad Habits"
 Video of the Year : Vitaa and Slimane - "De l'or"
 DJ of the Year : DJ Snake
 NRJ Award of Honor : Imagine Dragons
 Francophone Song of the Year : Kendji Girac - "Evidemment"

2022 Awards Winners - 24th NRJ Music Awards
 Francophone Male Artist of the Year : Orelsan
 Francophone Female Artist of the Year : Angèle
 Francophone Breakthrough of the Year : Lujipeka
 Francophone Duo/Group of the Year : Bigflo & Oli
 Francophone Collaboration of the Year : Bigflo & Oli featuring Julien Doré - "Coup de vieux"
 Francophone Video of the Year : Bigflo & Oli featuring Julien Doré - "Coup de vieux"
 Best Recovery or Adaptation : Soolking - "Suavemente"
 Social Hit : Alonzo featuring Ninho and Naps - "Tout va bien"
 International Male Artist of the Year : Ed Sheeran
 International Female Artist of the Year : Lady Gaga
 International Breakthrough of the Year : Sofia Carson
 International Duo/Group of the Year : Imagine Dragons
 International Collaboration of the Year : Camila Cabello featuring Ed Sheeran - "Bam Bam"
 International Song of the Year : Harry Styles - "As It Was"
 Francophone Tour of the Year : Orelsan
 DJ of the Year : David Guetta
 NRJ Award of Honour : Jenifer, Renaud
 Francophone Song of the Year : M. Pokora - "Qui on est"

References

External links
  

French music awards